The 2014 ICC East Asia-Pacific Men's Championship was a Twenty20 competition held from 19–23 November 2014 in Lismore, Australia. Papua New Guinea emerged as the winner of the tournament and qualified for the 2015 ICC World Twenty20 Qualifier.

Teams
Teams that qualified are as follows:

Fixtures

Group stage

Points table

Statistics

Most Runs
The top five run scorers (total runs) are included in this table.

Most Wickets
The top five wicket takers (total wickets) are listed in this table.

See also

2015 ICC World Twenty20 Qualifier
ICC EAP Cricket Trophy
Tournament results at CricHq

References

ICC EAP Cricket Trophy